Light This City is an American melodic death metal band from the Bay Area of San Francisco, that has been active from 2002. The band is notable for the aggressive vocal approach of frontwoman Laura Nichol.

History
Light This City's first album, The Hero Cycle, was released through Reflections on Ruin Records in 2003. Tyler Gamlen (guitars) and Ben Murray (drums) were the co-founders of Reflections of Ruin Records, and the album was also the label's first official release. 

The band's next three albums — Remains of the Gods (2005), Facing the Thousand (2006), and Stormchaser (2008) — were released through Prosthetic Records.  

In 2008, Light This City decided to disband. After disbanding, Laura Nichol (vocalist) and Ben Murray (drummer) formed a punk rock band called Heartsounds. Ryan Hansen (guitarist) and Jon Frost (bassist) formed the metal band The Urchin Barren.

In April 2010, Light This City played four reunion shows. Light This City played another reunion show on November 8, 2015 on the San Francisco date of Darkest Hour's 20th anniversary tour. In September 2017, following a 10-year hiatus, Light This City announced that the band had reformed and was working on completing a new album through Creator-Destructor Records. The resulting album, Terminal Bloom, was released on 25 May 2018.

Light This City's albums have featured collaborations with musicians such as Chuck Billy of Testament ("Firehaven" off Stormchaser), and Trevor Strnad of The Black Dahlia Murder ("Fear of Heights" off Facing the Thousand).

Band members

Current members
Laura Nichol – vocals 
Ben Murray – drums , guitars 
Steve Hoffman – guitar 
Ryan Hansen – guitar 
Jon Frost – bass

Previous members
Mike Dias – bass 
Alex Tomasino – guitar 
Tyler Gamlen – guitar 
Steven Shirley – guitar 
Joey Ellis – guitar 
Brian Forbes – guitar 
Dan Kenny – bass 

Timeline

Discography
The Hero Cycle (2003, Reflections of Ruin Records)
Remains of the Gods (2005, Prosthetic Records)
Facing the Thousand (2006, Prosthetic Records)
Stormchaser (2008, Prosthetic Records)
Light This City - Digital Collection (2017, Prosthetic Records)
Terminal Bloom (2018, Creator-Destructor Records)

See also
List of melodic death metal bands
List of female heavy metal singers

References

External links
 Official MySpace
 

Musical groups established in 2002
Musical groups disestablished in 2008
Musical groups reestablished in 2017
Metalcore musical groups from California
American melodic death metal musical groups
2002 establishments in California
2008 disestablishments in California